Dizaxlı (also, Dizakhly and Dızaxlı) is a village and municipality in the Qabala Rayon of Azerbaijan.  It has a population of 525.  The municipality consists of the villages of Dizaxlı and Sarıhacallı.

References 

Populated places in Qabala District